Paul-Heinz Wellmann (born 31 March 1952, in Haiger) is a former West German middle-distance runner who specialized in the 1500 metres.

As a teenager he won the silver medal at the 1970 European Junior Championships. He then finished seventh at the 1971 European Championships, the 1972 Summer Olympics and the 1974 European Championships.

He then won the gold medal at the 1976 European Indoor Championships, the bronze medal at the 1976 Summer Olympics and the silver medal at the 1977 European Indoor Championships

At the European Indoor Championships he had previously won three medals in relay races: a bronze medal in 4 × 800 m in 1971, and gold medals in 4 x 720 m in 1972 and 1973.

In domestic competitions, Wellmann represented the sports clubs TV 1885 Haiger and later TuS 04 Leverkusen. He became West German 800 metres champion in 1973 and 1500 metres champion in 1973, 1974 and 1976. He had a rivalry with Thomas Wessinghage.

Wellmann was trained by Gerd Osenberg, and after retiring he has trained Sonja Oberem and others. He was married to fellow distance runner Ellen Tittel for a period, who then took the surname Wellmann. They later divorced, but Ellen later married Thomas Wessinghage and took the name Ellen Wessinghage

References

1952 births
Living people
West German male middle-distance runners
Athletes (track and field) at the 1972 Summer Olympics
Athletes (track and field) at the 1976 Summer Olympics
Olympic athletes of West Germany
Olympic bronze medalists for West Germany
German athletics coaches
Medalists at the 1976 Summer Olympics
Olympic bronze medalists in athletics (track and field)